Street Singer is a hard bop album jointly led by tenor Tina Brooks and alto Jackie McLean. The tracks "Appointment in Ghana", "A Ballad for Doll" and "Isle of Java" were originally released in 1960 on McLean's album Jackie's Bag. The full session, including three previously unreleased tracks, was first released on the Japanese Blue Note label in 1980.

Track listing
 "Melonae's Dance" (McLean) - 6:50
 "Appointment in Ghana" (McLean) - 6:59
 "Medina" (Brooks) - 6:48
 "Isle of Java" (Brooks) - 7:31
 "Street Singer" (Brooks) - 10:19
 "A Ballad for Doll" (McLean) - 3:19

Personnel
Tina Brooks - tenor saxophone
Jackie McLean - alto saxophone
Blue Mitchell - trumpet
Kenny Drew - piano
Paul Chambers - bass
Art Taylor - drums

References

1980 albums
Tina Brooks albums
Blue Note Records albums
Albums produced by Alfred Lion
Jackie McLean albums
Albums recorded at Van Gelder Studio